YEV may refer to:

 YEV - Jewish Autonomous Oblast situated in the far eastern federal district of Russia.
 YEV - the IATA code for Inuvik (Mike Zubko) Airport.